Juan Manuel "Juanma" Ortiz Jiménez (born 28 May 1986) is a Spanish footballer. He currently plays for Faroese club Knattspyrnudeild UMFG as a forward.

Club career
Born in Atarfe, Granada, Andalusia, Ortiz made his senior debuts with local CP Granada 74 in the 2005–06 season. At the start of the 2007–08 campaign, his side became Granada 74 CF's reserve team and he made his professional debut with the latter on 20 October 2007, coming on as a late substitute in a 1–0 home win over Polideportivo Ejido in the Segunda División.

On 4 January 2008 Ortiz was loaned to Lucena CF of the Segunda División B. He subsequently returned to Granada 74 in June, being assigned to the main squad. In the following years he competed in the third level but also in Tercera División, representing Jerez CF, Loja CD (two stints), Real Jaén, CP Villarrobledo and UD Socuéllamos.

References

External links
Villarrobledo official website 

1986 births
Living people
Spanish footballers
Footballers from Andalusia
Association football forwards
Segunda División players
Segunda División B players
Tercera División players
Granada 74 CF footballers
Lucena CF players
Real Jaén footballers
Spanish expatriate footballers
Expatriate footballers in the Faroe Islands
Grindavík men's football players
Loja CD players